This is a list of yearly claims to an Independent Southern football championship from 1889 to 1932 (those not in the Southern Intercollegiate Athletic Association from 1895–1921, those not in the South Atlantic Intercollegiate Athletic Association from 1912–1921, and those not in the Southern Conference from 1922–1932), prior to the creation of the Southeastern Conference in 1933.

 1889 – Virginia
 1890 – Virginia
 1891 – Trinity
 1892 – Virginia or North Carolina
 1893 – Virginia
 1894 – Virginia
 1895 – Virginia
 1896 – Virginia
 1897 – Virginia
 1898 – North Carolina
 1900 – Virginia
 1901 – Virginia
 1902 – Virginia
 1903 – Kentucky University or Georgetown
 1904 – Georgetown
 1905 – VPI
 1908 – Virginia or George Washington
 1909 – VPI
 1915 – Georgia Tech
 1924 – Centre
 1926 – William & Mary

Notes

References

College football championships
College football-related lists